David Soul is the debut album by American actor and singer-songwriter David Soul, released in 1976.

On later editions of the album, Soul's hit single "Don't Give Up on Us" was featured in place of "One More Mountain to Climb".

Track listing

Charts

Weekly charts

Year-end charts

References

1976 debut albums
David Soul albums
albums produced by Elliot Mazer
Private Stock Records albums